Pickering Castle is a motte-and-bailey fortification in Pickering, North Yorkshire, England.

Design 

Pickering Castle was originally a timber and earth motte and bailey castle. It was developed into a stone motte and bailey castle which had a stone shell keep. The current inner ward was originally the bailey, and was built between 1180 and 1187. The keep was developed into a stone shell keep sometime during the years 1216 to 1236 along with the chapel – there is a reconstruction of the chapel at the site. Between the years 1323 and 1326 there was an outer ward and curtain wall built, along with three towers. There were also two ditches, one situated outside of the curtain wall and one in the outer ward. After this a gatehouse, ovens, hall and the storehouses were built. The castle is situated in the Vale of Pickering and has a considerably steep cliff on the west side which would have been a great defensive attribute.

History 

The original structure was built by the Normans under William the Conqueror in 1069–1070. This early building included the large, central mound (the motte), the outer palisades (enclosing the bailey) and internal buildings, notably the keep on top of the motte. Ditches were also dug to make assault on the walls difficult. The main purpose of the castle at this time was to maintain control of the area after the Harrying of the North.

Its remains are particularly well-preserved because it is one of only a few castles which were largely unaffected by the 15th-century Wars of the Roses and the English Civil War of the 17th century.

In 1926, the Ministry of Works (the predecessor of English Heritage) took possession of the castle. It is a Scheduled Monument and open to the public.

See also
Castles in Great Britain and Ireland
List of castles in England

References

External links

 Teachers' resource pack: English Heritage
 Official page: English Heritage

Castles in North Yorkshire
English Heritage sites in North Yorkshire
Ruins in North Yorkshire
Scheduled monuments in North Yorkshire
Ruined castles in England
Motte-and-bailey castles
Pickering, North Yorkshire